was one of 18 s built for the Imperial Japanese Navy (IJN) during the final stages of World War II. Completed in late 1944, the ship was assigned to convoy escort duties in February 1945. She was slightly damaged when she struck a mine in May. Sakura sank after striking another mine near Osaka on 11 July with heavy loss of life.

Design and description
Designed for ease of production, the Matsu class was smaller, slower and more lightly armed than previous destroyers as the IJN intended them for second-line duties like escorting convoys, releasing the larger ships for missions with the fleet. Their crew numbered 210 officers and enlisted men. The ships had two Kampon geared steam turbines, each driving one propeller shaft, using steam provided by two Kampon water-tube boilers.

The main armament of the Matsu-class ships consisted of three  Type 89 dual-purpose guns in one twin-gun mount aft and one single mount forward of the superstructure. The single mount was partially protected against spray by a gun shield. The accuracy of the Type 89 guns was severely reduced against aircraft because no high-angle gunnery director was fitted. The ships carried a total of twenty-five  Type 96 anti-aircraft guns in 4 triple and 13 single mounts. The Matsus were equipped with Type 13 early-warning and Type 22 surface-search radars. The ships were also armed with a single rotating quadruple mount amidships for  torpedoes. They could deliver their 36 depth charges via two stern rails and two throwers.

Construction and career
Authorized in the late 1942 Modified 5th Naval Armaments Supplement Program, Sakura (cherry blossom) was laid down on 2 June 1944 at the Yokosuka Naval Arsenal and launched on 6 September. Upon her completion on 25 November, the ship was assigned to Destroyer Squadron 11 of the Combined Fleet for training. On 12 February 1945, Sakura departed Moji as part of the escort for Convoy MOTA-36 bound for Keelung, Taiwan. She then escorted the cruiser  to Shanghai, China and remained in the area, tasked with patrol and escort duties. On 15 March the ship was reassigned to the squadron's Destroyer Division 53. Six days later Sakura arrived at Kure, Japan. The squadron was briefly attached to the Second Fleet from 1–20 April before rejoining the Combined Fleet. 

Sakura was slightly damaged when she struck a mine in Shimonoseki Strait between Kyushu and Honshu on 25 May. The ship was tasked with minesweeping duties the following month. When she struck a mine on 11 July in Osaka Harbor, her aft magazine exploded, severing her stern. The ship sank at coordinates  with the loss of 130 crewmen. Sakura was removed from the navy list on 10 August.

References

Bibliography

 
 

Matsu-class destroyers
Ships built by Yokosuka Naval Arsenal
1944 ships
World War II destroyers of Japan
Ships sunk by mines
Maritime incidents in July 1945
Shipwrecks of Japan